A by-election was held for the New South Wales Legislative Assembly seat of Willoughby on 25 September 1943. It was triggered by the death of Edward Sanders.

Dates

Results 

Edward Sanders died.

See also
Electoral results for the district of Willoughby
List of New South Wales state by-elections

References 

1943 elections in Australia
New South Wales state by-elections
1940s in New South Wales